During the 1997-98 season Bologna F.C. competed in Serie A and Coppa Italia.

Summary
Bologna Football Club 1909 had a successful season, in which it reached the top half of the standings in Serie A for the second year running. The most notable feature about the Bologna side was the presence of superstar Roberto Baggio, who flourished when getting out of a terrible spell at Milan. He scored 22 out of the teams' 55 goals, before leaving for Inter at the end of the season. Given that fellow strikers Kennet Andersson and Igor Kolyvanov also impressed, Bologna could live with losing Baggio. Other well-performing players included goalkeeper Giorgio Sterchele, defender Michele Paramatti and playmaker Carlo Nervo. On the last day of the season, the team classified to the 1998 UEFA Intertoto Cup.

Squad

Transfers

Competitions

Serie A

League table

Results by round

Matches

Coppa Italia

Eightfinals

Statistics

Players statistics

Goalscorers
  Roberto Baggio 22
  Kennet Andersson 12
  Igor Kolyvanov 9
  Michele Paramatti 5

References

Bologna F.C. 1909 seasons
Bologna